The 1981–82 Indiana Hoosiers men's basketball team represented Indiana University. Their head coach was Bobby Knight, who was in his 11th year. The team played its home games in Assembly Hall in Bloomington, Indiana, and was a member of the Big Ten Conference.

The Hoosiers finished the regular season with an overall record of 19–10 and a conference record of 12–6, finishing 2nd in the Big Ten Conference. IU was invited to participate in the 1982 NCAA Tournament as a 5-seed; the Hoosiers advanced to the second round, but they lost to 4-seed UAB.

Roster

Schedule/Results

|-
!colspan=8| Regular Season
|-

|-
!colspan=8| NCAA tournament

References

Indiana Hoosiers men's basketball seasons
Indiana
Indiana
1981 in sports in Indiana
1982 in sports in Indiana